Duma Riris Silalahi (born September 20, 1983) popularly known as Duma Riris is an Indonesian actress, singer, fashion model and a beauty pageant titleholder who won the title of Puteri Indonesia Lingkungan 2007. She represented Indonesia at the Miss International 2008 pageant in Macau.

Early life and education

Duma was born on 20 September 1983 in Medan, North Sumatra province – Indonesia, she has a batak descent from both of her parents. Duma holds a bachelor degree in Business Management from University of North Sumatra, Medan, North Sumatra, Indonesia. Since she was 13 years old, She joined several modelling competition for magazine, such as Femina (Indonesia), Jakarta Fashion Week model search and won the cover shoot model in 2006.

On 31 August 2013, She is married to Indonesian Idol (season 2) runner-up and now a soloist singer Judika Nalon Abadi Sihotang. On 20 October 2014, Duma gave birth to a daughter, Cleo Deora Boru Sihotang and on 6 February 2016 she gave birth to a son, Judeo Volante Sihotang.

Pageantry

Puteri North Sumatra 2007
In 2007, Duma competed in the regional pageant of Puteri North Sumatra 2006, and eded up winning the title to represent her province North Sumatra in Puteri Indonesia 2007. She was crowned by the outgoing titleholder Isra Kartika Sari Sinaga.

Puteri Indonesia 2007
At the age of 23, Duma joining the 12th annual Puteri Indonesia national beauty pageant. Duma was crowned as Puteri Indonesia Lingkungan 2007 at the grand finale held in Jakarta Convention Center, Jakarta, Indonesia on August 3, 2007, by the outgoing titleholder of Puteri Indonesia Lingkungan 2006 and Top 15 Miss International 2007, Rahma Landy Sjahruddin of Jakarta SCR 5. Duma represented her home province of North Sumatra at the pageant. In fact, Duma also first met her husband, Judika Nalon Abadi Sihotang during the Puteri Indonesia pageant in 2007.

Miss International 2008
As Puteri Indonesia Lingkungan 2007, Duma represented Indonesia at the 48th edition of Miss International 2008 pageant in held in The Venetian Macao, Macau. The finale was held on November 8, 2008. Priscila Perales of Mexico crowned her successor Alejandra Andreu of Spain by the end of the event.

Filmography

Duma has appeared on several music videos and movies.  She has acted in television and film.

Movies

TV Films

Music videos

See also
 Puteri Indonesia 2007
 Miss International
 Miss International 2008
 Gracia Putri Raemawasti

References

External links

 
 Puteri Indonesia Official Website
 Miss International Official Website
 Duma Riris Silalahi Official Instagram

Living people
1983 births
Puteri Indonesia winners
Miss International 2008 delegates
Indonesian beauty pageant winners
Indonesian female models
Indonesian stage actresses
Indonesian film actresses
Indonesian television actresses
Indonesian Christians
Actresses from Jakarta
People from Medan
People from North Sumatra
Batak people
University of North Sumatra alumni